Decay may refer to:

Science and technology
 Bit decay, in computing
 Software decay, in computing
 Distance decay, in geography
 Decay time (fall time), in electronics

Biology
 Decomposition of organic matter
 Tooth decay (dental caries), in dentistry
 Mitochondrial decay, in genetics

Physics
 Orbital decay, the process of prolonged reduction in the height of a satellite's orbit
 Particle decay
 Radioactive decay
 Optical decay, in quantum physics

Mathematics
 Exponential decay

Psychology and sociology
 Decay theory, in psychology and memory
 Social decay (decadence), in sociology
 Urban decay, in sociology

Entertainment

 Network decay (channel drift), in television programming
 Decay (DC Comics), a comic book character
 Half-Life: Decay, a 2001 video game add-on
 Deekay, a Danish production team
 Decay (professional wrestling), a professional wrestling stable in TNA Wrestling

Film
 Decay (2012 film), a 2012 zombie film set at the Large Hadron Collider
 Decay (2015 film), a 2015 American film

Music

 how quickly the sound drops to the sustain level after the initial peak, see ADSR envelope
 "Decay" (Ride song)
 "Decay" (Biohazard song)
 "Decay" (Sevendust song), 2013
 Decay Music, 1976 music album by Michael Nyman
 The Years of Decay, music album by Overkill (band)
 In Decay, 2012 album by Com Truise

Other
 Beta decay (finance)

See also
 Weathering
 Decomposition (disambiguation)